Bottle House is an unusual  private residence in Ganja built from glass bottles.

Overview 
Two-storey bottle house was built by Ibrahim Jafarov, a resident of Ganja in 1966-67 from glass bottles of different shapes and sizes, and colorful stones brought from Sochi. 48000 bottles were used in construction.

The construction of this house was dedicated to the memory of Ibrahim Jafarov's brother who went missing during World War II.

Decoration 
The construction year of the house was written on the wall of the front porch. A big portrait of missing brother Yusif Jafarov was drawn underneath the protrusion of the roof at the front. Additionally, the walls of the house were decorated with notes about Olympic Games held in USSR in the 1980s, and the name and portrait of the owner.

The words “Ganja” (the historic name of the city) were written on the different parts of the building with the bottoms of bottles, however during that time the city was officially called Kirovabad (1935-1989).

The house was reconstructed recently and is a popular destination for citizens and tourists.

See also 
 Ganja
 Architecture of Azerbaijan

References

External links 
 ganca.net
 

Ganja, Azerbaijan
Tourist attractions in Ganja, Azerbaijan
Buildings and structures in Ganja, Azerbaijan
1967 architecture
Glass buildings
Sustainable buildings and structures
Bottle houses